The 2019 Missouri Valley Conference men's basketball tournament, popularly referred to as "Arch Madness", was a postseason men's basketball tournament that completed the 2018–19 season in the Missouri Valley Conference. The tournament was held at the Enterprise Center in St. Louis, Missouri from March 7–10, 2019. 

No. 5 seed Bradley defeated No. 6-seeded Northern Iowa 57–54 in the championship game to win the tournament, and received the MVC's automatic bid to the NCAA tournament. It was the third overall MVC title for Bradley, the first since 1988.

Seeds
Teams were seeded by conference record, with ties broken by overall record in conference games played between the tied teams, then (if necessary) by NET Rating on the day following the conclusion of the regular season. The top six seeds received opening round byes.

Schedule

Tournament bracket

References

2018–19 Missouri Valley Conference men's basketball season
Missouri Valley Conference men's basketball tournament